Tumbledown Ranch in Arizona is a 1941 American Western film directed by S. Roy Luby and written by Milton Raison. The film is the sixth in Monogram Pictures' "Range Busters" series, and it stars Ray "Crash" Corrigan as Crash, John "Dusty" King as Dusty and Max "Alibi" Terhune as Alibi, with Sheila Darcy, Marian Kerby and Quen Ramsey. The film was released on April 20, 1941, by Monogram Pictures.

Plot

Cast
Ray "Crash" Corrigan as 'Crash' Corrigan 
John 'Dusty' King as 'Dusty' King 
Max Terhune as 'Alibi' Terhune 
Sheila Darcy as Dorothy Jones
Marian Kerby as Mother Rogers
Quen Ramsey as Gallop
James Craven as Dan Slocum
John Elliott as Judge Jones
Jack Holmes as Sheriff Nye
Steve Clark as Shorty Gill
Sam Bernard as Nick

See also
The Range Busters series:

 The Range Busters (1940)
 Trailing Double Trouble (1940)
 West of Pinto Basin (1940)
 Trail of the Silver Spurs (1941)
 The Kid's Last Ride (1941)
 Tumbledown Ranch in Arizona (1941)
 Wrangler's Roost (1941)
 Fugitive Valley (1941)
 Saddle Mountain Roundup (1941)
 Tonto Basin Outlaws (1941)
 Underground Rustlers (1941)
 Thunder River Feud (1942)
 Rock River Renegades (1942)
 Boot Hill Bandits (1942)
 Texas Trouble Shooters (1942)
 Arizona Stage Coach (1942)
 Texas to Bataan (1942)
 Trail Riders (1942)
 Two Fisted Justice (1943)
 Haunted Ranch (1943)
 Land of Hunted Men (1943)
 Cowboy Commandos (1943)
 Black Market Rustlers (1943)
 Bullets and Saddles (1943)

References

External links
 

1941 films
1940s English-language films
American Western (genre) films
1941 Western (genre) films
Monogram Pictures films
American black-and-white films
Films directed by S. Roy Luby
Range Busters
1940s American films